Mueller Industries is an American manufacturing company that specializes in conduits for refrigeration and heating systems. It was founded in 1917 and included on the Fortune 1000 list in 2012. The head office of the company is located in Memphis, Tennessee. Mueller Industries, Inc. is a multi-billion dollar revenue company that is publicly traded. The company has operations throughout the United States, Canada, Mexico, China, South Korea and Great Britain. The 2009 appointed CEO of the company is Gregory L. Christopher.

Description
Mueller Industries, Inc. manufactures and sells copper, brass, aluminum, and plastic products in the United States, Canada, Mexico, Great Britain, South Korea and China. It operates in two segments, Plumbing & Refrigeration and Original Equipment Manufacturers (OEM).

The Plumbing & Refrigeration segment offers copper tubes in straight lengths and coils; copper and plastic fittings, line sets, plastic pipes, valves, and related components for use in water distribution systems, heating systems, air-conditioning, and refrigeration applications, as well as for drainage, waste, and vent systems. It also fabricates steel pipe nipples and resells imported brass and plastic plumbing valves, malleable iron fittings, faucets, and plumbing specialty products to plumbing wholesalers and building materials retailers, as well as to distributors of manufactured housing and recreational vehicle industries.  This segment markets its products through its sales offices and distribution centers, and a network of agents.

References

External links
Office Page

Manufacturing companies based in Memphis, Tennessee